Nerle is a village in the Karmala taluka of Solapur district in Maharashtra state, India.

Demographics
Covering  and comprising 496 households at the time of the 2011 census of India, Nerle had a population of 2636. There were 1372 males and 1264 females, with 335 people being aged six or younger.

References

Villages in Karmala taluka